The Nankana massacre (or Saka Nankana Sahib) in Nankana Sahib gurdwara on 20 February 1921, at that time a part of the British India but today in modern-day Pakistan. Between 140 and 260 Sikhs were killed, including children as young as seven, by the Udasi Custodian Mahant Narayan Das and his mercenaries, in retaliation for a confrontation between him and members of the reformist Akali movement who accused him of both corruption and sexual impropriety. The event forms an important part of Sikh history. In political significance, it comes next only to Jallianwala Bagh massacre of April 1919. The saga constitutes the core of the Gurdwara Reform Movement started by the Sikhs in early twentieth century.

Background
At the time of the massacre, there was a growing demand in Sikhism that the traditional hereditary custodians hand over their control of the gurdwaras to democratically elected committees. As part of that movement, the Shiromani Committee decided of its own to meet the Mahant on 3 March 1921 to advise him to hand over the charge of gurdwara Nankana Sahib to the committee. But the Committee got the information from its own intelligence that Mahant was planning to invite the Sikh leaders at Nanakana Sahib and have them killed from hired gundas. This greatly angered Kartar Singh Jhabbar and others. A meeting of the Sikh leaders was called at Gurdwara Khara Sauda on 16 February 1921 to chalk out the future course of action. It was decided that Sangat would go in Jathas (squads) and take charge of the Gurdwara. Sikh leaders learnt that Mahant was going to Lahore on 20 February 1921. Bhai Kartar Singh Jhabbar and Bhai Lachaman Singh Dharowali decided to take their jathas to Nanakana Sahib on 20 February.

Peaceful Khalsa on the march
The combined Jatha took a Hukamnama and started for the Gurdwara at about 10 PM on that night so as to reach there by early morning at Amrit Velā (nectral hours). On the way 50 more Sikhs joined the Shaheedi Jatha and total number swelled to about 200.
At Chanderkot Jhal, Jathedar Lachhman Singh decided to wait for Kartar Singh Jhabber and his Jatha. They waited for a while in vain and finally Jathedar Dharowali decided to cancel the plan for further march to Nankana Sahib. But at this very moment, Jathedar Tehal Singh came forward and addressed the Shaheedi Jatha not to vacillate even for a moment from forward march since "the prayers having already been said and the action plan having already been decided with Guru's word, it is now imperative for now to move forward". Advising further that "all the members shall keep cool even under extreme provocations". From here-onwards, Jathedar Tehal Singh took over the supreme command of the Shaheedi Jatha and resumed the march to Nankana.

By almost at Amrit Velā, the Shaheedi Jatha reached the Railway-crossing near Nankana Sahib. Some of the Jatha members raced towards Darshani Deori to take possession of the Gurdawara, but at this very moment, Chaudhury Paul Singh Lyallpuri showed up with the latest decision of Shiromani Committee advising to postpone the action for taking possession of the Gurdwara. Having conveyed the information, Bhai Paul Singh grabbed Jathedar Lachhman Singh from his waist behind and persuaded him not to proceed further. Once again, Jathedar Tehal Singh took the initiative and shaking Chaudhury Paul Singh forcefully off from the person of Jathedar Lachhman Singh, he once more challenged the Shaheedi Jatha to get ready for the sublime action. He once again spoke: "Khalsa ji, the time is not to stop now, but to act. We have come here to achieve martyrdom under Guru's word. This is very un-Sikh-like to backout from one's commitment at the last moment". Saying this, Tehal Singh walked with the Jatha towards the Gurdwara. Lachhman Singh and others repeatedly requested him to relent, but Tehal Singh stuck to his Ardās.

The massacre
Enthused by the speech of Jathedar Tehal Singh, the entire Shaheedi Jatha followed him. By this time, another horseman messenger, Bhai Ram Singh, arrived. In vain did he too try to persuade Jathedar Tehal Singh and the Jatha to return. The Jatha soon entered Darshni Deohri of the Gurdwara and shut the main door from inside. While some of the devotees took their seats inside the Prakash Asthan, others sat on the platform and the Baran dari. Bhai Lachhman Singh Dharowali sat on Guru's tabia. Mahant Narayan Das came to know of the situation through the Jaikaras (victory slogans) of the Shaheedi Jatha. At first, he was utterly shocked thinking that the game was over but he soon recovered and ordered his mercenaries to kill everyone in the Jatha. They fired bullets at the Sangat in Gurdwara hall. Several bullets pierced through Sri Guru Granth Sahib. The hired gundas wielded swords, spears, hatchets and other lethal weapons to mercilessly slaughter the peaceful and unprovocative Sikhs within the very premises of the Gurdwara. The dead and dying Singhs were then dragged to a pile of logs which had been collected earlier and consigned to flame. By the time the police and local Sikhs came on the scene, all the dead men had been consumed by the fire.

Response

Bhai Lachhman Singh Dharowali who was wounded with a gunshot was tied to a Jand tree and burnt alive.

The news spread and Sikhs from all parts of Punjab started their march towards Nankana Sahib. Bhai Kartar Singh Jhabber reached next day with 2200 Singhs armed with shastras (arms). Fearing more trouble, Mr King, Commissioner Lahore, handed over the keys of Nankana Sahib to Shiromani Committee and arrested Mahant Narayan Das and his Pashtun mercenaries and charged them with murder, but only Das and some of the mercenaries were sentenced to death.

Statistics on fatalities
A total of 86 Sikhs officially died.

Mahatma Gandhi in Nankana Sahib
Mahatma Gandhi visited Nankana Sahib on March 3, 1921. Addressing the gathering, Mahatma said: "I have come to share your anguish and grief. It is interesting indeed to note that the Sikhs in this drama remained peaceful and non-violent from the start to the end. This (role of the Sikhs) has greatly added to the glory and prestige of India "..... "All indications point to the fact that the cruel and barbaric action is the second edition of Jallianwala Bagh massacre; rather more evil and more invidious than even Jallianwala". Gandhi further spoke: "the action of these dimensions could not be perpetrated by Mahant alone. The government officers are also involved in this heinous crime. Where had the authorities gone when the Mahant was making preparations for murderous plans?"

Legacy
The supreme sacrifices made by these Sikhs Shaheeds have been gratefully acknowledged by the Sikhs. From that day onwards, the Sikhs remember these braves in their daily ardas (prayer). Every year on 20 February at this Shaheedi Asthan, Guru Granth Sahib's Saroop with Bullet marks is brought to Deewan (assembly) from 2pm to 4pm for darshan of the Sikh Sangat.

References

Film,Books and periodicals
 Saka – The Martyrs of Nankana Sahib
 Gurdwara Reform Movement, and The Sikh Awakening, 1984, Teja Singh
 Akali, Lahore, October 8, 1920
 Akali Morchian Da Itihaas, 1977, Sohan Singh Josh
 Meri Aap Beeti, Master Sunder Singh Lyalpuri (unpublished)
 Gurdwara Arthaat Akali Lehir, 1975, Giani Pratap Singh
 Struggle for Reform in Sikh Shrines, (Ed Dr Ganda Singh)
 Khushwant Singh: A History of the Sikhs, 1966.
 Shaheedi Jeewan, 1938, Gurbaksh Singh Shamsher
 Glimpses of Sikhism and Sikhs, 1982, Sher Singh Sher
 Encyclopedia of Sikhism, Vol I, II, Harbans Singh
 Sikhan di Janam Bhoomi - Sri Nanakana Sahib Tract No. 432
 Nanakana Sahib Darshan Taangh Tey Paryatan Tract No. 175
 Nanakana Sahib Da Hirdey Vedhak Saka Tract No. 413
 Nanakana Sahib dey Shahidan nu Shardhanjli Tract No. 179
 Sri Nanakana Sahib da Shaheedi Saka February 21, 1921 - Lal Singh, Narain Singh M.A. Tract No. 196
 Akali Lehar No. 1 Arthat Sudhar Khalsa - Gyani Kartar Singh Classwalya
 Some Confidential Papers Of The Akali Movement - Dr. Ganda Singh (Ed.)

External links
 Massacre at Nankana Sahib
 Sikh Gurdwaras in History and Role of Jhabbar

History of Sikhism
Sikhism in Pakistan
Nankana Sahib District